The Vyatka is a river in Kirov Oblast and the Republic of Tatarstan in Russia, a right tributary of the Kama.

The Vyatka begins in the northern parts of Udmurtia. It freezes up in the early November and stays under the ice until the second half of April. The Vyatka teems with fish: bream, roach, tench, sheat fish, pike, European perch, zander, etc.

The Vyatka is navigable from its mouth to the city of Kirov,  upriver. The main ports are Kirov, Kotelnich, Sovetsk, and Vyatskiye Polyany.

Tributaries

The largest tributaries of the Vyatka are, from source to mouth:

 Belaya (right)
 Kobra (right)
 Letka (right)
 Belaya Kholunitsa (left)
 Cheptsa (left)
 Velikaya (right)
 Bystritsa (left)
 Moloma (right)
 Pizhma (right)
 Voya (left)
 Urzhumka (right)
 Kilmez (left)
 Shoshma (right)

References

Rivers of Kirov Oblast
Rivers of Tatarstan
Rivers of Udmurtia